Andreas Jakob von Dietrichstein (27 May 1689, Moravia – 5 January 1753, Salzburg) was successor to Prince-Archbishop Liechtenstein and ruled in Salzburg from 1747 to 1753, shortly before the birth of Wolfgang Amadeus Mozart.

Biography

Early life
Andreas Jakob came from the Nikolsburger (Moravian) line of the House of Dietrichstein, whose origin can be traced back to Carinthia. His father was Maximilian Andreas (1638-1692), Count of Dietrichstein, his mother Maria Justina (1647-1696), daughter of Edmund III, Count of Schwarzenberg.

Ecclesiastical career
He studied from 1707 in Salzburg, where he became a canon in 1713, cathedral dean in 1729, and cathedral provost in 1730.

On 10 September 1747, he was elected Archbishop of Salzburg. He was probably a compromise candidate for the canons, but the people clearly desired a Salzburg prince at the time, namely Dietrichstein. The episcopal consecration was performed on 1 June 1749 by Josef Maria Reichsgraf von Thun und Hohenstein, Bishop of Gurk.

He was a worthy and, unlike his predecessor, popular archbishop of a simple and gaunt look. He was a notable connoisseur of Salzburg life, a zealous and emphatically industrious person, but also a friend of festivals, masked balls and the theater.

Dietrichstein also suffered from the great financial difficulties of the archbishopric, which had been significantly aggravated by the previous Protestant expulsion. He was able to reduce the amount required by the Pope for his episcopal consecration and also achieved that this was paid by Maria Theresa of Austria.

In view of the financial difficulties, he campaigned on one hand for special frugality in his court and in the administration, with restrictions on court dress, and abandoning construction of large buildings, all the while promoting economic growth to the best of his ability.

The Wasserspiele in Hellbrunn were only poorly repaired. The "Mechanical Theater" of the Hellbrunner Wasserspiele was newly built. Lorenz Rosenegger committed 343 guilders to create 100 new figures and to initiate construction, which was met with several difficulties and a significant increase in costs. Dietrichstein also renovated the dilapidated Andreaskirche (Linzergasse).

Dietrichstein's motto was "amore et justitia" - "Through love and justice" - a principle to which he remained loyal for life as a just prince and friend of the people.

Dietrichstein died on 5 January 1753. Despite all the accentuated thrift, Dietrichstein left his successor high debts.

Archbishop Dietrichstein was buried in the crypt of the Salzburg Cathedral.

References

External links
  
 Biography of Andreas Jakob von Dietrichstein

1689 births
1753 deaths
Andreas
Roman Catholic archbishops of Salzburg
18th-century Roman Catholic archbishops in the Holy Roman Empire
Moravian nobility
Prince-archbishops of Salzburg